The 2021–22 Minnesota State Mavericks men's ice hockey season was the 53rd season of play for the program. They represented Minnesota State University, Mankato in the 2021–22 NCAA Division I men's ice hockey season and for the 1st season in the Central Collegiate Hockey Association (CCHA). They are coached by Mike Hastings, in his 10th season, and play their home games at Mayo Clinic Health System Event Center.

Season
Minnesota State joined with six other members of the WCHA to restart the CCHA for the 2021–22 season. With their new conference being relatively weak in national rankings, the Mavericks scheduled several games against non-conference opponents that were expected to be very strong. MSU kicked off the season with a road series against the defending national champions Massachusetts. Dryden McKay, who was just 3 shutouts shy of tying the career record of 27 held by Ryan Miller, kicked off the campaign with an 18-save blanking of the Minutemen. That game set te tone for the entire season; Minnesota State relied on a constant offensive attack that kept the puck in their opponent's end. Holding to the maxim 'the best defense is a good offense', MSU stopped most of their opponents from generating offensive chances by forcing them to defend. When their defense was called upon, the corps, led by Jake Livingstone and captain Wyatt Aamodt, was up to the task and limited the opposing forwards to fewer than 20 shots on goal on most nights. Of those reduced shots, only a paltry number managed to get past McKay.

The Mavericks began the season by playing both of the finalists from the previous year's national championship and won three out of four games. For their third week, the team participated in the Ice Breaker Tournament and lost the championship game to Michigan, the then-#3 team in the country. While the defeat cost MSU their #1 ranking, they were still left with a very strong resume as they entered their conference schedule.

After sweeping Northern Michigan, which included McKay's record-breaking shutout, Minnesota State played probably its worst game of the season against lowly Ferris State. While the Mavs could only manage a single goal, the defense allowed the Bulldogs to get 30 shots on McKay, the most they would allow all season. The team responded by flattening their foes over the next couple of weeks, winning their next five games by an average score of nearly 6–1, including two more shutouts. While the CCHA's overall weakness held Minnesota State back, the sheer number of victories and the overwhelming nature of play could not be ignored and MSU received the #1 ranking for the second time in late-November.

McKay was forced to miss the team's first game against Lake Superior State, giving freshman Keenan Rancier his first career start. While the backup played well, allowing just 1 goal, the team's offense fell flat and they were shutout for the only time on the season. McKay returned the following night and began a run of games that was nearly unheard of in NCAA history; Minnesota State won each of their next nine games with McKay allowing a maximum of 1 goal in each affair. The stretch of 12 consecutive games by MSU of allowing less than 2 goals was the longest in Division I history. The five shutouts recorded during that run put McKay at 32 for his career and 8 on the season. He was not, however, alone for lofty goaltending statistics. both Yaniv Perets and Devon Levi were also having magical seasons for their respective programs, leading some to call the 2022 season as the 'Year of the Goaltender'.

When Minnesota State lost its fifth game of the season, they were firmly established one of the two best teams in the country (Michigan being the other). MSU was top three in both goals for and goals against as well as boasting the nation's scoring leader Nathan Smith. With that in mind, there was little surprise when, after the NHL backed out of the 2022 Winter Olympics, head coach Mike Hastings was added to Team USA's coaching staff. Smith joined soon afterwards but, despite persistent rumors, Dryden McKay was not included on the roster.

MSU did not lose a beat in their absence and won their final eleven regular season games. In winning 20 out of 21 games, Minnesota State became one of the select few teams to post 30 wins during the regular season and were rewarded by nearly sweeping the CCHA awards. They were also mathematically guaranteed to make the NCAA tournament and receive a favorable seeding for at least the opening round.

CCHA tournament
The Mavericks continued their inspired play in the postseason, posting a pair of wins over St. Thomas to all but guarantee MSU one of the four #1 seeds. A demolition of Northern Michigan, who had upset the Mavs the year before, sealed a top seed and set the team up for a showdown against Bemidji State. The Beavers were fighting for a tournament appearance, being ranked too low to earn an at-large bid, and gave the Mavericks everything they had. MSU was held scoreless for more than half the game and, when Bemidji netted the first goal around the mid-way point of the match, it appeared that the boys in green may have had a chance. Fortunately for the Mavericks, their power play, which had been a strength for them all season, provided them with the tying goal and forced the game into overtime. Less than three minutes into the extra session, The puck found its way into the Bemidji cage and Minnesota won the revived CCHA championship.

Half an hour later, after hoisting the trophy and heading to the locker room, both teams were called back onto the ice. While the goal was initially ruled to be a 'good goal', a camera angle that had initially not been available to replay showed conclusively than the puck had gone under the goal cage rather then through the 4-by-6 opening. The goal was waved off and both teams were recalled to the ice to resume the game. Luckily for the Mavericks, their very next shot went into the goal cleanly and they were able to celebrate a championship after was is described as 'the craziest championship ever'. The win was also McKay's 35 victory on the season, breaking the record that had jointly been held by college hockey legends Robb Stauber and Marty Turco.

NCAA tournament
MSU received the #2 overall seed and began their run facing Harvard, the ECAC Hockey champion. The first 35 minutes of the game was a complete mismatch. The Mavericks scored the first three goals and were completely dominating the Crimson in shots and offensive zone time. Everything changed in the later part of the second period when Sean Farrell fired a puck from behind the goal line that deflected in off of McKay's skate. Less than a minute later Harvard netted their second goal and had reduced the Mavericks' advantage to just 1. Ondřej Pavel scored on a rush early in the third to put a little distance between the two but Harvard would not go away and they netted a third marker on the power play with 3:31 left on the clock. The Crimson went on a furious charge at the MSU cage and twice had looks at a half-open cage. Luck was with the Mavs, however, as both shots went awry and Minnesota State escaped with a 4–3 victory.

The quarterfinal match against Notre Dame turned into a classic goaltending battle with both McKay and Matthew Galajda playing nearly perfect games. While MSU more than doubled up the Irish in shots over the first 20 minutes, they were only able to sneak the final one into the goal with just 16 seconds remaining in the period. Smith's marker remained the only goal for the rest of the contest as both teams attacked relentlessly but to no avail. Vital to the win was MSU's penalty-kill which held Notre Dame back during their three man-advantages.

In the national semifinals, which consisted entirely of western teams, Minnesota State faced off against Minnesota. Though the two had never had much of a rivalry, this was the second time in as many years that they were meeting in the NCAA tournament. As they had all season, MSU shot out of the gate and dominated play for most of the match. It was the Gophers, however, who opened the scoring in the first. The Mavericks were undeterred and continued to assail the Minnesota net. They finally managed to break through mid way through the second and that began a deluge of goals. Minnesota State scored the final 5 markers to take the game comfortably and send the team to its first ever Division I championship game appearance.

The final game of the year looked to be following a familiar format when Minnesota State controlled the puck from the opening faceoff and outshout Denver 18–8 through the first 40 minutes. Despite the disparity in play, the Mavericks only enjoyed a 1–0 lead entering the third and little room for error with how well Denver's defense was playing. In the final frame, MSU appeared to move away from the constant attack that was the hallmark of the team and played a more traditional defensive shell. This maneuver proved disastrous for the club as it allowed the Pioneers to get their offense flowing. Denver scored three times in the third and a shell-shocked Mavericks team scrambled to respond. They ended up being forced into pulling McKay for an extra attacker but all that served to do was give Denver two empty-net goals. When the final buzzer sounded, one bad period had completely sunk Minnesota State's entire season and ruined the championship hopes for the school.

Doping ban
After the season, it was reported that Dryden McKay, who had by then won the Hobey Baker Award, accepted a 6-month suspension from international hockey for testing positive for a banned substance. The United States Anti-Doping Agency could have imposed as much as a 4-year suspension, however, the body accepted the evidence that McKay provided which proved he had unwittingly consumed the substance as part of an effort to combat COVID-19. On the weekend that the team was to play Lake Superior State, a strain of the flu was going around the Mavericks' locker room. Compounded with increased worries over the Omicron variant, McKay took non-NSF-certified antiviral supplements over the course of 10 days that had been contaminated with Ostarine. The drug is typically used to combat muscle wasting and osteoporosis and has been banned by the World Anti-Doping Agency since 2008.

McKay had submitted the sample on January 23 and the results were available by January 31. Because this occurred prior to the start of the Olympics, it was likely the primary reason that McKay was left off the United States Olympic roster. Minnesota State had given a mandatory provisional suspension to McKay on February 3 but had lifted the prohibition on the same day. Since Ostarine was detected in a sealed bottle sent to a testing lab by the manufacturer, McKay was determined to have not been at fault for the positive test and remained eligible to play for the remainder of the season.

Departures

Recruiting

Roster
As of August 20, 2021.

|}

Standings

Schedule and results

|-
!colspan=12 style=";" | Regular season

|-
!colspan=12 ! style=""; | 

|-
!colspan=12 style=";" | Regular season

|-
!colspan=12 style=";" | 

|-
!colspan=12 style=";" |

National championship

Scoring statistics

Goaltending statistics

Rankings

Note: USCHO did not release a poll in week 24.

Awards and honors

Players drafted into the NHL

2022 NHL Entry Draft

† incoming freshman

References

Minnesota State Mavericks men's ice hockey seasons
Minnesota State
Minnesota State
Minnesota State
Minnesota State
Minnesota State